Paso de las Duranas is a cultural center in Montevideo, Uruguay.

Location
It is located in Aires Puros, between Belvedere and Sayago to the northwest, Lavalleja to the north and Prado to the south.

Landmarks
Paso de las Duranas is home to the National Museum of Anthropology and to the Museo de la Memoria, which is dedicated to the history of the fight of the Uruguayan people against the repression of the dictatorship. In its east side it also contains the northmost edge of the Prado park, where the former building of the Sociedad Nativista was transformed into a museum.

Educational facilities
 Colegio y Liceo Mariano (private, Roman Catholic, Oblates of St. Francis de Sales)

Places of worship
 Church of the Immaculate Conception, Casaravilla 867 esq. Av. Millán; popularly known as "Iglesia de Paso de las Duranas" (Roman Catholic, Oblates of St. Francis de Sales)

See also
Barrios of Montevideo

References

External links

 Centro Cultural y Museo de la Memoria, Intendencia de Montevideo

Barrios of Montevideo